Perry Wilbon Howard (1835–1907) was a blacksmith and a state legislator in Mississippi. He represented Holmes County, Mississippi in the Mississippi House of Representatives from 1872 to 1875 and also served on the county board of supervisors.

He was born into slavery in South Carolina and was brought to Mississippi before the American Civil War. His children became doctors, an attorney, and teachers. Perry Wilbon Howard II was one of his sons.

See also
African-American officeholders during and following the Reconstruction era

References

1835 births
American freedmen
19th-century American politicians
Mississippi Republicans
African-American politicians during the Reconstruction Era
American blacksmiths
African-American state legislators in Mississippi
1907 deaths